Puerto Rico Highway 145 (PR-145) is a rural road that travels from Ciales, Puerto Rico to Morovis. This road extends from its junction with PR-146 and PR-149 in downtown Ciales and ends at PR-155 between Morovis Norte, Torrecillas and Fránquez barrios.

Major intersections

See also

 List of highways numbered 145

References

External links
 

145